Corwin Walter Artman (January 8, 1907 – March 9, 1970) was an American football offensive lineman in the National Football League for the New York Giants, the Boston Braves, and the Pittsburgh Pirates.  He played college football at Stanford University.

References

1907 births
1970 deaths
Players of American football from Santa Monica, California
American football offensive guards
American football offensive tackles
Stanford Cardinal football players
New York Giants players
Boston Braves (NFL) players
Pittsburgh Pirates (football) players